Pataveh (also Romanized as Pātāveh, Pāţāveh, and Pataweh) is a city in and the capital of Pataveh District, in Dana County, Kohgiluyeh and Boyer-Ahmad Province, Iran. At the 2006 census, its population was 1,925, in 377 families.

See also
Arrajan

References

Populated places in Dana County

Cities in Kohgiluyeh and Boyer-Ahmad Province